Rahmat Erwin Abdullah (born 13 October 2000) is an Indonesian weightlifter. He is a two-time gold medalist in the men's 73 kg event at the World Weightlifting Championships (2021 and 2022). He won a bronze medal at the 2020 Summer Olympics. He is a weightlifter competing in the 73 kg class since 2018 World Weightlifting Championships in Ashgabat, Turkmenistan. He made his international debut at the 2017 Youth World Weightlifting Championships held in Bangkok, Thailand in the 69 kg class.

Biography 
Rahmat is the only child of the former weightlifters Erwin Abdullah and Ami Asun Budiono. Erwin, who won silver medal at the 2002 Asian Games, originally qualified for the 2004 Summer Olympics, but was no allowed to compete due to injury. His mother, Ami, was won gold medal at the 1995 Southeast Asian Games.

Career
At the 2019 Asian Junior Championships held in Pyongyang, North Korea, he participated in the 73 kg category, winning his first gold medal. At that time, he managed to lift 147 kg in the snatch and 179 kg in the clean and jerk category, bringing the overall total to 326 kg and finishing first above the North Korean lifter, Ko Myong-ho.

After that competition, he participated in the 2019 Southeast Asian Games which was held in the Philippines. At that time he won the second gold medal in international competitions after defeating Vietnamese lifter, Phạm Tuấn Anh with a total lift of 322 kg while Vietnamese lifter with 304 kg.

Not only that, when he started the first international competition in 2020 at the 2020 Asian Junior Championships which was held in Tashkent, Uzbekistan, he won the third gold medal for his international competition after defeating Iranian lifter Mir Mostafa Javadi.

He represented Indonesia at the 2020 Summer Olympics in Tokyo, Japan and won a bronze medal.

He won the gold medal in the men's 73kg event at the 2022 World Weightlifting Championships held in Bogotá, Colombia.

Awards and nominations

Major results

References

External links 
 

2000 births
Living people
Sportspeople from Makassar
Indonesian male weightlifters
Weightlifters at the 2020 Summer Olympics
Olympic weightlifters of Indonesia
Olympic bronze medalists for Indonesia
Olympic medalists in weightlifting
Medalists at the 2020 Summer Olympics
World Weightlifting Championships medalists
Competitors at the 2019 Southeast Asian Games
Southeast Asian Games gold medalists for Indonesia
Southeast Asian Games medalists in weightlifting
Competitors at the 2021 Southeast Asian Games
21st-century Indonesian people